Muspiceidae is a family of nematodes belonging to the order Muspiceida.

Genera:
 Lukonema Chabaud & Bain, 1974
 Maseria Rausch & Rausch, 1983
 Muspicea Sambon, 1925
 Pennisia Bain & Chabaud, 1979
 Riouxgolvania Bain & Chabaud, 1968

References

Nematodes